Vanitha Rangaraju-Ramanan (born 1970) is an Indian animator who works for DreamWorks Animation. Rangaraju was part of the team for movie Shrek that won an Academy Award for Best Animated Feature  at the 74th Academy Awards in Los Angeles, United States and BAFTA Award for Best Adapted Screenplay at the 55th British Academy Film Awards in London, United Kingdom, for which she was credited as Lighting Technical Director.

Early life 
Rangaraju was born 1970 in Tiruchirappalli, where she went to school and graduated with a Bachelor of Architecture from the Regional Engineering College, Tiruchirappalli (now known as National Institute of Technology, Tiruchirappalli). In 1996, she pursued Master's program at the University of Texas at Austin followed by an internship at Industrial Light & Magic in 1998. Since then she has been with DreamWorks Animation.

Filmography 
Vanitha has worked in the following films and shows:

References

External links 

 Interview of Vanitha Rangaraju for Puss in Boots - YouTube
Vanitha Rangaraju at the SpongeBob's 20th Anniversary - YouTube

1970 births
Indian animators
Animators from Texas
Artists from Tiruchirappalli
Living people
National Institute of Technology, Tiruchirappalli alumni
Women artists from Tamil Nadu
Indian women animators
University of Texas at Austin alumni